Nu or NU may refer to:

Arts and entertainment

Music
 Nu metal, a heavy metal fusion genre
 Nu jazz, a jazz fusion genre
 Nu-disco, a genre of dance music
 Nu gaze, a shoegaze fusion genre
 Nu prog, a subgenre of progressive rock
 Nu-funk, a genre of dance music

Other media
 Nu-13, a fictional character from the BlazBlue video game series
 Nu (Chrono Trigger), a fictional species from the video game Chrono Trigger
 N.U. (film), 1948 documentary film directed by Michelangelo Antonioni
 Mr. Nu, a fictional character from the novel Hitman: Enemy Within
 Nu Gundam from the anime Mobile Suit Gundam: Char's Counterattack
 Nickelodeon Universe, an indoor theme park at Mall of America
 Nu, a 1934 collection of essays written in Romanian by Eugène Ionesco

Businesses and organizations

Universities

United States
 National University (California), a private nonprofit university in La Jolla, California, United States
 Niagara University, a Roman Catholic university in Niagara County, New York, United States
 Northeastern University, a research university in Boston, Massachusetts, United States
 Northwest University (Washington), a private university in Kirkland, Washington, United States
 Northwestern University, a research institution in Evanston, Illinois, United States
 Norwich University, a private military and traditional university in Northfield, Vermont, United States
 University of Nebraska–Lincoln, United States

Japan
Nagoya University, a national research university
Niigata University, a national university
Nihon University, a private university in Tokyo

Other countries
Nazarbayev University, an international research university based in Astana, Kazakhstan
 Nanjing University, a national university in China
 Naresuan University, a public university in Phitsanulok, Thailand
 Nile University, a private research university in Egypt
 National University (Philippines), a private, non-sectarian university in Manila, Philippines
 NU Bulldogs, the intercollegiate athletic program of the above school
 Nkumba University, a private university near Entebbe, Uganda
 Nirma University, a private university in Ahmedabad, India
 Northern University, Nowshera, a private university in Nowshera, Pakistan

Other businesses and organizations
 Nahdatul Ulama, an Islamic group in Indonesia
 Northeast Utilities, a gas and electric company in the northeastern United States
 Northern Union, an early name of the Rugby Football League
 NU.nl, a Dutch online newspaper
 Nubank (NYSE: NU), a Brazilian bank
 Japan Transocean Air (IATA airline designator NU)

Language
 Nu (cuneiform), a cuneiform sign
 Nu (letter), a letter in the Greek alphabet: lowercase ν, uppercase Ν
 Nu (kana), the Japanese characters ぬ and ヌ
 Nu (Yiddish), a Yiddish interjection meaning "so what" or "hurry up"
 Nǀu language, a moribund Tuu (Khoisan) language spoken by the Nǁnǂe people in South Africa

People

Burmese people
 Nga Nu, a pretender to the Ava throne (1367)
 Saya Gyi U Nu, a writer famous during King Bodawpaya's reign (r. 1782–1819)
 Me Nu, chief queen of King Bagyidaw (r. 1819–1837)
 U Nu, prime minister of the Union of Burma (1948–1958; 1960–1962)

Other peoples
 Nu people, a Chinese ethnic group

Places
 Nu river or Salween River, in China, Burma, and Thailand
 Nicaragua (NATO country code NU)
 Niue, (ISO 3166 country code NU)
 .nu, the Internet top-level domain for Niue
 Nunavut, the largest and newest of the territories of Canada
 North Uist, an island in the Scottish Hebrides

Science and technology
 .nu, the Internet top-level domain for Niue
 Nu (programming language), an interpreted object-oriented programming language
 NuMachine, a computer architecture developed at MIT
 Nucellar embryony (Nu+), a form of seed reproduction that occurs in certain plant species
 Nusselt number (Nu), a dimensionless heat transfer ratio
 Nanodalton, a unit of mass; see dalton (unit)
 NU, the abbreviation for natural uranium, referring to uranium with the same isotopic ratio as found in nature
 Not used (N.U.), indicating not populated parts in schematics and BOMs
 Poisson's ratio, a dimensionless ratio relating strain on element along one axis to the strain in an orthogonal axis, is symbolized by the Greek letter Nu, ν

Other uses 
 Nu (mythology), the male form of the Egyptian goddess Naunet
 The Chinese term for crossbow, as in the chu-ko-nu or repeating crossbow
 Bhutanese ngultrum (Nu.), the official currency of Bhutan
The IATA airline code for Japan Transocean Air
NU, designation used for the Nestle-Aland and United Bible Societies biblical texts in the New King James Version

See also
 Nus (disambiguation)
 Gnu, GNU
 New (disambiguation)